Norway has participated in the biennial classical music competition Eurovision Young Musicians 17 times since its debut in 1982, winning the contest for the first time in 2012. Norway did not officially take part in 1984, the only contest the country has missed as of 2022, and hosted the contest in 2000.

The nations were represented individually, following the introduction of a preliminary round, at the 1986 contest.

Participation overview

Hostings

See also
Norway in the Eurovision Song Contest
Norway in the Junior Eurovision Song Contest

References

External links
 Eurovision Young Musicians

Countries in the Eurovision Young Musicians